The 1986 NHL Entry Draft was the 24th NHL Entry Draft. It was held on June 21, 1986, at the Montreal Forum in Montreal, Quebec. The National Hockey League (NHL) teams selected 252 players eligible for entry into professional ranks, in the reverse order of the 1985–86 NHL season and playoff standings. This is the list of those players selected.

The last active player in the NHL from this draft class was Teppo Numminen, who retired after the 2008–09 season.

Selections by round
Below are listed the selections in the 1986 NHL Entry Draft. Club teams are located in North America unless otherwise noted.

Selections by round:
 Round one
 Round two
 Round three
 Round four
 Round five
 Round six
 Round seven
 Round eight
 Round nine
 Round ten
 Round eleven
 Round twelve

Round one

Round two

 The Los Angeles Kings' second-round pick went to the Philadelphia Flyers as the result of a trade on October 11, 1985 that sent Paul Guay and Philadelphia's fourth-round pick in 1986 NHL Entry Draft to Los Angeles in exchange for Steve Seguin and this pick.
 The Toronto Maple Leafs' second-round pick went to the Montreal Canadiens as the result of a trade on December 17, 1982 that sent Gaston Gingras to Toronto in exchange for this pick.
 The Vancouver Canucks' second-round pick went to the Philadelphia Flyers as the result of a trade on June 6, 1986 that sent Dave Richter, Rich Sutter and Philadelphia's third-round pick in 1986 NHL Entry Draft to Vancouver in exchange for Jean-Jacques Daigneault, Vancouver's fifth-round pick in 1987 NHL Entry Draft and this pick.
 The New York Rangers' second-round pick went to the Minnesota North Stars as the result of a trade on December 9, 1985 that sent Roland Melanson to the Rangers in exchange for the Ranger's fourth-round pick in 1987 NHL Entry Draft and this pick.
 The Montreal Canadiens' second-round pick went to the Toronto Maple Leafs as the result of a trade on September 18, 1985 that sent Dominic Campedelli to Montreal in exchange for Montreal's fourth-round pick in 1986 NHL Entry Draft and this pick.
 The Philadelphia Flyers' second-round pick went to the Quebec Nordiques as the result of a trade on June 21, 1986 that sent Quebec's second-round pick in 1987 NHL Entry Draft to Quebec in exchange for this pick.

Round three

 The Vancouver Canucks' third-round pick was re-acquired as the result of a trade on June 6, 1986 that sent Jean-Jacques Daigneault, Vancouver's second-round pick in 1986 NHL Entry Draft and fifth-round pick in 1987 NHL Entry Draft to Philadelphia in exchange for Dave Richter, Rich Sutter and this pick.
 Philadelphia previously acquired this pick as the result of a trade on March 12, 1985 that sent Glen Cochrane to Vancouver in exchange for this pick.
 The Hartford Whalers' third-round pick went to the New York Rangers as the result of a trade on September 5, 1984 that sent Steve Weeks to Hartford in exchange for future considerations (this pick).
 The Boston Bruins' third-round pick went to the Minnesota North Stars as the result of a trade on May 16, 1986 that sent Tom McCarthy to Boston in exchange for Boston's second-round pick in 1987 NHL Entry Draft and this pick.
 The Chicago Black Hawks' third-round pick went to the Buffalo Sabres as the result of a trade on October 15, 1982 that sent Bob Sauve to Chicago in exchange for this pick.
 The Calgary Flames' third-round pick went to the Minnesota North Stars as the result of a trade on June 15, 1985 that sent Minnesota's second-round pick in 1985 NHL Entry Draft and second-round pick in 1987 NHL Entry Draft to Calgary in exchange for Kent Nilsson and an optional third-round picks in 1986 NHL Entry Draft (this pick) or 1987 NHL Entry Draft.
 The Quebec Nordiques' third-round pick went to the Washington Capitals as the result of a trade on March 10, 1986 that sent Peter Andersson to Quebec in exchange for this pick.
 The Philadelphia Flyers' third-round pick went to the New Jersey Devils as the result of a trade on March 11, 1986 that sent Glenn Resch to Philadelphia in exchange for this pick.

Round four

 The Toronto Maple Leafs' fourth-round pick was re-acquired as the result of a trade on September 18, 1985 that sent Dominic Campedelli to Montreal in exchange for Montreal's second-round pick in 1986 NHL Entry Draft and this pick.
 Montreal previously acquired this pick as the result of a trade on August 17, 1984 that sent Bill Root to Toronto in exchange for this pick.
 The Philadelphia Flyers' fourth-round pick was re-acquired as the result of a trade on December 18, 1985 that sent Joe Paterson to Los Angeles in exchange for this pick.
 Los Angeles previously acquired this pick as the result of a trade on October 11, 1985 that sent Steve Seguin and Los Angeles' second-round pick in 1986 NHL Entry Draft to Philadelphia in exchange for Paul Guay and this pick.

Round five

 The New Jersey Devils' fifth-round pick went to the St. Louis Blues as the result of a trade on September 19, 1985 that sent Mark Johnson to New Jersey in exchange for Shawn Evans and this pick.
 The St. Louis Blues' fifth-round pick went to the Montreal Canadiens as the result of a trade on January 31, 1986 that sent Kent Carlson to St. Louis in exchange for Graham Herring and this pick.
 The Philadelphia Flyers' fifth-round pick went to the New York Islanders as the result of a trade on June 21, 1986 that sent Mike Murray to Philadelphia in exchange for this pick.

Round six

 The Minnesota North Stars' sixth-round pick went to the Quebec Nordiques as the result of a trade on November 15, 1985 that sent Ed Lee to Minnesota in exchange for this pick.

Round seven

 The Winnipeg Jets' seventh-round pick went to the Quebec Nordiques as the result of a trade on October 14, 1985 that sent Dan Bouchard to Winnipeg in exchange for this pick.
 The Minnesota North Stars' seventh-round pick went to the New York Islanders as the result of a trade on September 9, 1985 that sent Mats Hallin to Minnesota in exchange for this pick.

Round eight

Round nine

Round ten

Round eleven

Round twelve

 The New Jersey Devils' twelfth-round pick went to the St. Louis Blues as the result of a trade on August 29, 1985 that sent Perry Anderson to New Jersey in exchange for Rick Meagher and this pick.
 The Buffalo Sabres' twelfth-round pick went to the New Jersey Devils as the result of a trade on March 11, 1986 that sent Phil Russell to Buffalo in exchange for this pick.

Draftees based on nationality

See also
 1986 NHL Supplemental Draft
 1986–87 NHL season
 List of NHL players

References
 2005 NHL Official Guide & Record Book

External links
 1986 NHL Entry Draft player stats at The Internet Hockey Database

Draft
National Hockey League Entry Draft